Jaime Subirats (June 17, 1945 — September 5, 2015) was a Mexican professional tennis player.

Subirats, who grew up in Mexico City, received a full scholarship to attend Lamar University in Texas and played collegiate tennis from 1965 to 1968. He won a Southland Conference singles championship, was an NCAA College Division Championship singles finalist and formed a strong doubles combination with Sherwood Stewart during his time at Lamar University. His best performance on tour came at the 1966 U.S. National Championships, where he won matches against Butch Seewagen and Claude de Gronckel, before falling in the third round to Jim Osborne.

References

External links
 
 

1945 births
2015 deaths
Mexican male tennis players
Lamar Cardinals and Lady Cardinals athletes
College men's tennis players in the United States
Tennis players from Mexico City